Abdulwasiu Omotayo Showemimo (born 10 October 1988, in Lagos) is a Nigerian defender playing for Abia Warriors F.C.

Career
Showemimo began his career 2005 on the youth side for Zamfara United F.C. and signed in the spring 2006 for  team Gateway F.C. He played 38 games in two seasons for Gateway and signed in summer 2008 for Kano Pillars F.C.
He transferred to Dolphins before the 2012 season. In January 2014 he signed with Premier League newcomers Abia Warriors.

International career 
He was called up for the camp prior to November 2010 friendly against Iran, but had to drop out due to an injury. He made his Eagles' debut as a substitute in the February 2011 friendly against Sierra Leone.
Showemimo represented previously the Nigeria beach football team in an International tournament in South Africa.

References

1988 births
Living people
Nigerian footballers
Nigeria international footballers
Kano Pillars F.C. players
Sportspeople from Lagos
Yoruba sportspeople
Gateway United F.C. players
Dolphin F.C. (Nigeria) players
Association football central defenders
Abia Warriors F.C. players
Zamfara United F.C. players